In the x86 assembly programming language, MOVDDUP is the name for a specific action performable by modern x86 processors with 3rd-generation Streaming SIMD Extensions (SSE3). This action involves copying a number to temporary space in the processor for use in other computations.

Specifically, MOVDDUP causes one, double-precision, floating-point source to be copied to both the lower half and upper half of an XMM register.

Usage

The source operand can be either an XMM register (xmm2) or a memory address (m64). When the source operand is an XMM register, the lower half of the register is used in the operation. When the source operand is a memory address, it is assumed to be the address of an 8-byte region, the value at which is used in the operation.

The destination operand must be an XMM register (xmm1).

Potential exceptions

References
 documentation.
Intel 64 and IA-32 Architectures Software Developer's Manual Volume 2A: Instruction Set Reference, A-M, November, 2006.
https://software.intel.com/sites/landingpage/IntrinsicsGuide/

See also
MOVAPS/MOVAPD
MOVHLPS
MOVHPS/MOVHPD
MOVLHPS
MOVLPS/MOVLPD
MOVMSKPS/MOVMSKPD
MOVNTPS
MOVSHDUP
MOVSLDUP
MOVSS/MOVSD
MOVUPS/MOVUPD

x86 instruction listings

X86 instructions